St. Sarkis Armenian Apostolic Church was established on May 24, 1942 on Waterman Street in Detroit, MI, US. The current location in Dearborn, MI was dedicated on October 14, 1962; it serves the Armenians in Eastern Michigan, and is one of the Churches of the Prelacy of the Armenian Apostolic Church of America under jurisdiction of the Holy See of Cilicia. The congregation supports the Armenian Senior Citizen Tower, also called St Sarkis Towers, a 151-unit low income/senior housing facility near the church.

External links 
 www.saintsarkis.org

Armenian-American culture in Michigan
Armenian Apostolic churches in the United States
Churches in Detroit
Christian organizations established in 1942
Oriental Orthodox congregations established in the 20th century
Dearborn, Michigan
1942 establishments in Michigan